Clitheroe F.C. was an English association football club, from Lancashire, England.

First Clitheroe club 
The club was founded in 1879; founder members included Nathan Aldersley, who co-founded the Ribblesdale Cricket League.  The same year Low Moor F.C. was founded in the same town, which instantly made it difficult for either club to become competitive on the national, or even local, stage. The club's first entry to the Lancashire Senior Cup, in 1880-81, saw it lose 10-1 at Blackburn Rovers in the first round; its second, in 1881-82, saw it lose 7-0 at Livesey Grasshoppers in the second, "to the surprise of all interested in the match".

The club competed in the FA Cup main draw four times in the 1880s, not once going past the first round.  The only time the club even forced a replay was in 1883-84, drawing 3-3 against South Shore at home, after the Clitheroe umpire mistakenly made a claim for offside against the wrong South Shore player, ensuring the resulting goal was awarded.  The replay was a "very rough and unpleasant" game and, despite registering 12 corners to 4, Clitheroe went out 3-2, the second South Shore goal being disputed.

Clitheroe were one of the many Lancastrian clubs that were paying players, in breach of the Football Association rules, and withdrew from the Cup in 1884-85 because of an effective embargo on the club's fixtures.  The club was one of those which formed the British Football Association, and when the FA legalized professionalism, Clitheroe could play in the 1885-86 FA Cup competition without fear; however the first round draw put them at home to holders (and eventual winners) Blackburn Rovers and the club lost 2-0 in what was perhaps the club's best objective result.  

The club however does not seem to have survived the season, the final reported match for the club being a home draw with Low Moor in March 1886.

Second Clitheroe club 

On 7 October 1887 a meeting of players took place to consider "whether a football club could not be started in the town".  It was decided to form a club, again called Clitheroe Football Club, but this time as an amateur club.  At the end of the 1888-89 season, the club's ground was taken for building, so the club moved to the Waterloo playing fields; Clitheroe continued to wear the blue of the old club.  From 1889 the club entered the FA Cup again but did not get past the qualifying rounds.

Clitheroe Central split

At the start of 1891, there was a split in the club, with many of the players joining the newly-formed Clitheroe Central.   In order to prevent the new club gaining traction, Clitheroe reported Central to the Lancashire Football Association for poaching players before Central had even played a match, with the result that a number of players sat out a short suspension.

Lancashire League and end of the club

The club's finest triumph was winning the Lancashire Junior Cup in 1892-93, the team being welcomed from Whalley Station by five waggonettes and serenaded by the Borough Prize Band with the songs "See The Conquering Hero Comes" and "The Man Who Broke The Bank At Monte Carlo".

The club joined the Lancashire League in 1894-95, but, after struggling for three out of four seasons, was forced to go into liquidation before the end of the 1896-97 season, with a debt of £200.

Honours

Lancashire Junior Cup
Winners: 1892-93
Runners-up: 1893-94

References

Defunct football clubs in England
Defunct football clubs in Lancashire
Association football clubs disestablished in 1876